Joëlle Kapompolé (born 23 December 1971 in Kolwezi, Zaire) is a Belgian politician and a member of the PS. She was a member of the Belgian Senate from 2004 to 2009.

Notes

1971 births
Living people
People from Kolwezi
Socialist Party (Belgium) politicians
Members of the Senate (Belgium)
Naturalised citizens of Belgium
Belgian people of Democratic Republic of the Congo descent
Democratic Republic of the Congo emigrants to Belgium
Members of the Parliament of Wallonia
Members of the Parliament of the French Community
21st-century Belgian politicians
21st-century Belgian women politicians